Mal Anderson and John Newcombe were the defending champions.

Seeds

Draw

Finals

Top half

Top half 1

Top half 2

Bottom half

Bottom half 1

Bottom half 2

External links
 1975 Australian Open – Men's draws and results at the International Tennis Federation

Men's Doubles
Australian Open (tennis) by year – Men's doubles